Erol Sander (born 9 November 1968 as Urçun Salihoğlu) is a Turkish-German actor.

Filmography

 1990: Two's a Crowd (TV series) - Jannicke Guigue
 1997:  (TV series) - Philippe Roussel
 2000: Zwei Leben nach dem Tod
 2001: The Apocalypse (TV film) - Ionicus
 2001-2002: Sinan Toprak ist der Unbestechliche (TV series) - Kriminalhauptkommissar Sinan Toprak
 2003: Spurlos – ein Baby verschwindet (TV film) - Peter Wedekind
 2003: Für immer verloren (TV film) - Erkan Öcelit
 2003: Betty – Schön wie der Tod (TV film) - Thomas Lohner
 2003:  (TV film) - the Shah
 2003: Mein Mann, mein Leben und du (TV film) - Frank Moss
 2003: Rosamunde Pilcher: Federn im Wind (TV) - David Norris
 2004: Tausendmal berührt (TV film) - Leon Willfahrt
 2004: Alexander - Persian Prince
 2004: Vernunft und Gefühl (TV film)
 2004: Liebe ist (k)ein komisches Wort
 2005: Wenn der Vater mit dem Sohne (TV film) - Paul Bachmann
 2005: Ums Paradies betrogen (TV miniseries) - Andrew Stoughton
 2005: Die Liebe eines Priesters (TV film) - Michael
 2005: Wen die Liebe trifft (TV film) - Luca Berger
 2005: Inga Lindström: Sprung ins Glück (TV) - Axel Hasselroth
 2005: Andersrum (TV film) - Makler
 2005: Die goldene Stadt
 2005: Liebe hat Flügel
 2006: 
 2006: Im Himmel schreibt man Liebe anders (TV film) - Christoph Fischer
 2006–2011: Die Alpenklinik (TV series, 6 episodes) - Dr. Daniel Guth
 2007: Im Tal der wilden Rosen (TV series) - Jake Cross
 2007: Eine Liebe in Kuba (TV film) - Jan Holzer
 2007: Der Zauber des Regenbogens (TV film) - Brian O'Casey
 2007:  (TV film) - Bernhard Reichenberg
 2008: Die Blüten der Sehnsucht (TV film) - Paul Pflüger
 2008: Rebecca Ryman: Olivia and Jai (TV film) - Jai Raventhorne
 2008-2018: Mordkommission Istanbul (TV series, 22 episodes) - Police Inspector Mehmet Özakin
 2009: Tatort: Familienaufstellung (TV) - Durmus Korkmaz
 2016: Snowden - Diplomat Party Guest

Personal life 
In 2000 Sander married Frenchwoman Caroline Godet, a niece of director Oliver Stone.

References

External links
 
  

1968 births
Living people
Turkish emigrants to West Germany
German male television actors
German male film actors
21st-century German male actors
Male actors from Munich